The Central Bank of Yemen is the central bank of Yemen.

The Bank is engaged in developing policies to promote financial inclusion and is a member of the Alliance for Financial Inclusion.

The Central Bank of North Yemen was established in 1971 and the Central Bank of South Yemen in 1972. When the northern and southern sectors of Yemen reunited on 22 May 1990, the Central Bank of Yemen (of the north) merged with the Bank of Yemen (of the south) under the original name of “Central Bank of Yemen”.

Governors of the Central Bank
Abdul Aziz Abdul Ghani, 1971-1975
Abdulla al-Sanabani, 1975-1985
Mohammad Ahmed al-Junaid, 1985-1990
Mohammad Ahmed al-Junaid, 1990-1994
Alawi Saleh al-Salami, 1994-1997
Ahmed Abdul Rahman Al-Samawi, 1997-2010
Mohamed Awad Bin Humam, 2010-2016
Mansar Al-Quaiti (in Aden), 2016-2018
Mohamed Mansour Zemam (in Aden), 2018-2019
Hafedh Meyad (in Aden), 2019
Ahmed Obaid Al Fadhli (in Aden), 2019-2021
Ahmed Bn Ahmed Ghaleb al-Mabaqi (in Aden), 2021- incumbent

See also

Economy of Yemen
Yemeni rial
Ahmed Abdul Rahman Al-Samawi

References

External links
 Official site: Central Bank of Yemen

Economy of Yemen
Yemen
1990 establishments in Yemen
Banks established in 1971
Banks established in 1990
Banks of Yemen
Government of Yemen